Ajay Varma (born 18 February 1963) is an Indian former cricketer. He played as a bowler for Kerala during the 1980s. He was rated as one of the fastest bowler in his days in south India, he reigned terror in the kerala cricket circuit with sheer pace and was instrumental in State Bank of Travancore cricket team emerging as a reckoning force in South. His career was cut short by a knee injury. At present he is working as Asst Manager in State Bank of Travancore.

References
 CricketArchive
 Cricinfo

1963 births
Living people
Indian cricketers
Kerala cricketers
South Zone cricketers
Sportspeople from Alappuzha
Cricketers from Kerala